Abdallah Khan (born  - died ) was an Iranian court painter and architect of the Qajar era, active between 1810 and 1850. His greatest work was a grand mural in the Negarestan Palace in the capital Tehran, but he is also known to have painted murals at the Soleymaniyeh Palace in Karaj, as well as life-size portraits amongst others.

Background

Not much is known about Abdallah Khan's personal life. He was born  and is known to have received his apprenticeship in the royal workshops, working as one of the groups of artists (naqqashan-e naqqashkhane-ye homayun). In 1839, he was appointed by the Qajar shah Mohammad Shah (1834-1848) as painter laureate (naqqāsh bāshī), court architect (me῾mār bāshī) and supervisor of the royal workshops. Following his appointment, all groups such as the painters (naqqashan), architects (me'maran), engineers (mohandisan), enamelers (minakaran), carpenters (najjaran), lapidaries/sculptors (hajjaran), potters (fakhkharan), glass-cutters (shishe-baran), smiths (haddadan), janitors (saraydaran), gardeners (baghbanan), canal diggers (moqanniyan) and candle makers (shamme'an) were ought to recognize Abdallah Khan as their supervisor.

Khan was part of the first generation of Qajar-era painters, which also included Mirza Baba, Mihr 'Ali, and Mohammad Hasan Khan. He is known to have met William Price in 1812 in Tehran, an orientalist and a member of the Gore Ouseley mission to Iran, whom he showed several of his paintings. He died , during the early reign of Naser al-Din Shah Qajar (1848-1896).

Negarestan Palace mural
 
His best-known work was a mural covering three internal walls of the Negarestan Palace audience hall in Tehran. The work depicts 118 life-size figures. The end wall depicts an enthroned Fath-Ali Shah Qajar (1797-1834), the then reigning Shah of Iran, attended by twelve of his sons and six gholams, who wield the royal shield amongst others. On the side walls, two strings of courtiers and foreign envoys and guards are shown. Amongst the latter are the British John Malcolm, Harford Jones (later named Harford Jones-Brydges), and Gore Ouseley on one side.

The orientalist Edward Granville Browne, in the late 1880s, reading the inscription below the painting, attributed the work to Abdallah Khan and dated it to 1812-1813. However, most 19th-century travellers in Iran incorrectly attributed it to Mohammad Hasan Khan, including George Curzon. Philipp Walter Schulz also followed Curzon's error. The original work was later lost, but a full-scale copy was made in 1904 during the reign of Mozaffar ad-Din Shah Qajar (1896–1907), and is currently stored in the Persian Foreign Office. Several reduced (small-scale) copies were also made for European diplomats and visitors. One of these was engraved in London in 1834 by Robert Havell.

Soleymaniyeh Palace mural
In 1813-1814, shortly after completing the Negarestan Palace mural, Abdallah Khan completed other murals (frescoes) in the Soleymaniyeh Palace (now the National School of Agriculture) in Karaj. These depict the courts of Agha Mohammad Khan Qajar (1789-1797) and Fath-Ali Shah Qajar. A few fragments of this mural were maintained in the library of the aforementioned school.

Other works
Abdallah Khan was also known for being an adept painter in enamel and oil. He also painted several full-length portraits of Fat′h-Ali Shah Qajar, including one housed in the Victoria and Albert Museum, which depicts him wearing a red robe and a bejewelled Astrakhan cap. He was also the imperial designer of Fath-Ali Shah's marble cenotaph in Qom. His relationship with two of his former colleagues, Mirza Baba (who also held the title of naqqāsh bāshī) and Mihr 'Ali, remains unclear. Whereas they also worked in other media, such as lacquer and enamel, Abdallah Khan seemingly confined himself to oil painting.

References

Sources

External links

Iranian painters
19th-century Iranian architects
19th-century Iranian painters
People of Qajar Iran
Court painters